Sévère Dumoulin (February 4, 1829 – May 17, 1910) was a politician from Quebec, Canada.

Background

He was born on February 4, 1829, in Trois-Rivières, Mauricie.  He was a lawyer.  He was married to Frances Sophia Macaulay in 1862 and to Elizabeth Broster in 1877.

Mayor of Trois-Rivières

Dumoulin served as a Council member from 1857 to 1861 and from 1864 to 1865 and as Mayor of Trois-Rivières from 1865 to 1869 and from 1879 to 1885.

Provincial Politics

He ran as a Conservative candidate in the district of Trois-Rivières in 1867 and lost, but won a by-election in the same district in 1868.  He resigned in 1869 to accept an appointment as a sheriff.

Dumoulin ran again in 1881 as a Conservative candidate in the same district and won.  However the election was cancelled and he lost the subsequent by-election.

Death

He died on May 17, 1910.

Footnotes

External links
 

1829 births
1910 deaths
Conservative Party of Quebec MNAs
Mayors of Trois-Rivières